Mitcham Girls High School, located in Kingswood, is the only single-sex government high school in the state of South Australia. It has approximately 850 students in grades 7 to 13. As the school is unzoned, it attracts students from all across the Adelaide metropolitan area as well as some regional locations.

History 
Mitcham Girls High School was founded in 1964. The site was previously Kingswood High School from 1914 to 1917, and then from 1918 to 1963, it was a co-educational site incorporating nearby Unley High School before becoming a girls-only technical high school in 1964.

In 2015, 18% of students were from non-English-speaking backgrounds, as well as students from overseas studying under an international education program.

The school is a member of the Alliance of Girls' Schools Australasia. Since 1993, the school has regularly had teams participate in the World Solar Challenge.

Facilities
The school has a quarter-Olympic-sized swimming pool and a performing arts centre.

Notable alumni
 Nat Cook, Australian politician

Notable staff
 Bianca Reddy, Australian netball player
 Mike Elliot, former politician
 Chloe Fox, former politician

References

External links 

High schools in South Australia
1964 establishments in Australia
Educational institutions established in 1964
Alliance of Girls' Schools Australasia
Girls' schools in Australia
South Australia
Schools in South Australia